The 1913 Iowa Hawkeyes football team represented the University of Iowa as a member of the Western Conference during the 1913 college football season. Led by fourth-year head coach Jesse Hawley, the Hawkeyes compiled an overall record of 5–2 with a mark of 1–2 in conference play, tying for second place in the Western Conference. The team played home games at Iowa Field in Iowa City, Iowa.

Schedule

References

Iowa
Iowa Hawkeyes football seasons
Iowa Hawkeyes football